Stefania Berton (born 19 July 1990) is an Italian former competitive pair skater. With partner Ondřej Hotárek, she is the 2013 European bronze medalist, the 2013 Skate Canada International champion, and a three-time Italian national champion. Berton/Hotárek are the first Italian pair skaters to win European and Grand Prix medals.

Berton previously competed as a single skater and ice dancer.

Personal life 
Stefania Berton was born 19 July 1990 in Asiago, Italy. In January 2012, she became a member of the sports group of the Italian police. She became engaged to American pair skater Rockne Brubaker on 2 February 2013. The couple married on June 5, 2015 in Wisconsin.

Career 
As a singles skater, Berton won the silver medal at the 2007 Italian Nationals and placed 6th at the 2006 Junior Grand Prix Final. As an ice dancer, she competed on the novice level with Marco Fabbri.

Partnership with Hotarek 

Berton teamed up with Ondřej Hotárek to compete in pair skating in early 2009. They won the silver medal at 2010 Italian Nationals and were selected to compete at the World Championships. They placed 11th in their debut at the event.

During the 2010–11 season, Berton/Hotárek won silver at the Nebelhorn Trophy and also debuted on the Grand Prix circuit, finishing sixth at Cup of Russia. They won their first Italian national title and were sent to the 2011 European Championships. They placed fourth in the short program and fifth in the free program, setting personal bests in both, and finished fifth overall with their best combined total to date, 164.83 points.

Berton/Hotárek began the 2011–12 season at the 2011 Ondrej Nepela Memorial, where they won the silver medal. In the Grand Prix season, they placed 4th at 2011 NHK Trophy and then won bronze at 2011 Rostelecom Cup, making them the first Italian pair to medal on the Grand Prix circuit. At the 2012 European Championships, they placed 4th, historically the highest Italian result in pairs.

In the 2012–13 season, Berton/Hotárek were assigned to the 2012 Skate Canada International and 2012 Trophée Eric Bompard. After taking bronze at both events, they won bronze at the 2013 European Championships, becoming the first Italian pair skaters to medal at Europeans.

Berton/Hotárek started the 2013–14 Grand Prix season at the 2013 Skate America and finished 5th. They won their first GP title at the 2013 Skate Canada and then finished 4th at the 2014 European Championships, behind Vera Bazarova / Yuri Larionov. Berton/Hotárek finished 11th in the pairs event at the 2014 Winter Olympics in Sochi, Russia.

For the 2014-15 season, Berton/Hotarek were assigned to 2014 Skate America and the 2014 Rostelecom Cup. On 2 July 2014, La Gazzetta dello Sport reported that their partnership had ended. In August 2014, Berton said she had not wanted to split from Hotarek and that she was searching for a partner to continue her competitive career.

Programs

With Hotarek

Single skating

Competitive highlights

Pair skating with Hotárek

Single skating

References

External links 

 
 

1990 births
Living people
People from Asiago
Italian female pair skaters
Italian female single skaters
European Figure Skating Championships medalists
Figure skaters at the 2014 Winter Olympics
Olympic figure skaters of Italy
Sportspeople from the Province of Vicenza